Leopoldina is a municipality in the Brazilian state of Minas Gerais. , it has a population of 52,640.

It is situated in the southeastern Zona da Mata mesoregion of the state.

The municipality contains the  Lapinha Biological Reserve, a strictly-protected area of Atlantic Forest.

Leopoldina was the site of a wave of immigration of Jews, mostly from Eastern Europe, in the 1920s and 1930s, as detailed in a book Jews of Leopoldina, published in 2007 by the Jewish Museum of Rio de Janeiro.

The city is also the seat of the Roman Catholic Diocese of Leopoldina.

References

Municipalities in Minas Gerais